The First García-Page Government was the regional government of Castilla–La Mancha, formed in July 2015 and led by Emiliano García-Page (PSOE), who took possession as President of the Junta of Communities of Castilla–La Mancha on 4 July. The ministers ("consejeros") assumed office on 9 July. Two Podemos ministers entered the council of government in August 2017.

Aside from the president and his ministers, the director of the Woman Institute Araceli Martínez and the spokesperson Nacho Hernando (without rank of regional minister) also meet at the council of government. The members of the cabinet served in acting capacity since the May 2019 regional election until the formation a new government presided again by García-Page in July 2019.

Council of Government

Notes

References 

2015 establishments in Castilla–La Mancha
Cabinets established in 2015
Cabinets of Castilla–La Mancha